Connor Evan Fields (born September 14, 1992) is an American professional BMX racer. He represented the United States at the 2012 Summer Olympics in the men's BMX event and finished 7th overall. He represented the United States again at the 2016 Summer Olympics in the men's BMX event. He won the gold medal in Rio de Janeiro, and became the first American to win an Olympic BMX gold.

In the semifinals of the 2020 Summer Olympics BMX event, Fields crashed off a jump heading into the first turn in the third run and failed to complete the trial. The Olympic committee tweeted their best wishes for recovery to Fields and Australian cyclist Saya Sakakibara who was injured in a women's semifinals event the same day.

Fields announced his retirement from the sport August 11, 2022.

Early life
Fields graduated from Green Valley High School (Nevada).

References

External links
 
 
 
 
 
 

1992 births
Living people
American male cyclists
BMX riders
Olympic gold medalists for the United States in cycling
Cyclists at the 2020 Summer Olympics
Cyclists at the 2012 Summer Olympics
Cyclists at the 2016 Summer Olympics
Medalists at the 2016 Summer Olympics
Pan American Games medalists in cycling
Pan American Games gold medalists for the United States
Cyclists at the 2015 Pan American Games
Medalists at the 2011 Pan American Games
UCI BMX World Champions (elite men)
Green Valley High School (Nevada) alumni